The Republic of the Congo competed in the Olympic Games for the first time at the 1964 Summer Olympics in Tokyo, Japan.  The Games were hosted from October 10, 1964 to October 24, 1964. The delegation of Congo consisted of two athletes. Congo did not receive medals at the 1964 Summer Olympics.

Athletics

Men
Track & road events

Field events

References

 Official Olympic Reports

External links
 

Nations at the 1964 Summer Olympics
1964
1964 in the Republic of the Congo